Eric Nickulas (born March 25, 1975) is an American former professional ice hockey right winger. He played in the National Hockey League for the Boston Bruins, St. Louis Blues, and Chicago Blackhawks between 1999 and 2006.

Biography
Nickulas was born in Hyannis, Massachusetts. As a youth, he played in the 1989 Quebec International Pee-Wee Hockey Tournament with the New York Islanders minor ice hockey team.

Nickulas was drafted 99th overall by the Boston Bruins in the 1994 NHL Entry Draft. In three years with Boston, he played mostly for the Providence Bruins of the American Hockey League.

Nickulas scored his first NHL Goal on March 2, 2000 in Boston's 5-2 home loss Versus Montreal.

He also played for the St. Louis Blues and the Chicago Blackhawks before returning to Boston in 2005. In 2006. Nickulas moved to Germany, signing with the Hannover Scorpions. After two seasons with Hannover, he played for the ERC Ingolstadt of the Deutsche Eishockey Liga in Germany.

Career statistics

Regular season and playoffs

References

External links
 

1975 births
Living people
American men's ice hockey right wingers
Barnstable High School alumni
Boston Bruins draft picks
Boston Bruins players
Chicago Blackhawks players
ERC Ingolstadt players
Hannover Scorpions players
Ice hockey players from Massachusetts
New Hampshire Wildcats men's ice hockey players
Norfolk Admirals players
Orlando Solar Bears (IHL) players
People from Hyannis, Massachusetts
Providence Bruins players
Sportspeople from Barnstable County, Massachusetts
St. Louis Blues players
Worcester IceCats players